The 1910 LSU Tigers football team represented Louisiana State University (LSU) as a member of the Southern Intercollegiate Athletic Association (SIAA) during the 1910 college football season. John W. Mayhew in his second and final season as head coach, the Tigers compiled an overall record of 1–5 with a mark of 1–3 in SIAA play.

Schedule

Roster

Roster from Fanbase.com

References

LSU
LSU Tigers football seasons
LSU Tigers football